Eyes are the round holes that are a characteristic feature of Swiss-type cheese (e.g. Emmentaler cheese) and some Dutch-type cheeses.  The eyes are bubbles of carbon dioxide gas.  The gas is produced by various species of bacteria in the cheese.

Swiss cheese 
In Swiss-type cheeses, the eyes form as a result of the activity of propionic acid bacteria (propionibacteria), notably Propionibacterium freudenreichii subsp. shermanii. These bacteria transform lactic acid into propionic acid and carbon dioxide, according to the formula:

3 Lactate → 2 Propionate + Acetate + CO2 + H2O

The CO2 so produced accumulates at weak points in the curd, where it forms the bubbles that become the cheese's eyes. Not all CO2 is so trapped: in an  cheese, about 20 L CO2 remain in the eyes, while 60 L remain dissolved in the cheese mass and 40 L are lost from the cheese.

Dutch cheese 
In Dutch-type cheeses, the CO2 that forms the eyes results from the metabolisation of citrate by citrate-positive ("Cit+") strains of lactococci.

Bibliography 
Polychroniadou, A. (2001). Eyes in cheese: a concise review. Milchwissenschaft 56, 74–77.

References

Footnotes 

Cheese
Carbon dioxide
Food chemistry
Food science